Lucretia Lombard, also known as Flaming Passion, is a 1923 American silent drama film directed by Jack Conway and produced and distributed by Warner Bros. Based upon the 1922 novel of the same name by Kathleen Norris, it stars Irene Rich, Monte Blue, and a young Norma Shearer, just prior to her signing with MGM.

Cast

Box office
According to Warner Bros records the film earned $348,000 domestically and $37,000 foreign.

Preservation status
This film still survives at George Eastman House and Pacific Film Archive. It was transferred onto 16mm film by Associated Artists Productions in the 1950s and shown on television.

References

External links

1923 films
American silent feature films
Films directed by Jack Conway
Films based on American novels
Warner Bros. films
Films produced by Harry Rapf
1923 drama films
American black-and-white films
Silent American drama films
Surviving American silent films
1920s American films